Luzanivka Hydropark is a park in Odesa, Ukraine, at the coast of the Gulf of Odesa. It is located in the historical quarter Luzanivka between the Mykolaiv Road and coastal line. The park was named after Grigory Kotovsky during the Soviet period, therefore it is presented at the title Kotovsky Park on many of maps. The Luzanivka Beach is located in the park. The western part of the park is almost greeneries less.

The total reconstruction of the park was provided in 2011. The central avenue of the park was reconstructed just in 2014.

Luzanivka Beach 
It differs from the other beaches in Odesa in that Luzanivka Beach is naturally sandy, because it is located at the natural sandbar (separated the Kuyalnik Estuary from the Gulf of Odesa). The sea bottom is sloped, the beach is well adapted for the children resort. The land at this part is on the same level as the sea water. The beach opens to a nice view of the downtown of Odesa. Luzanivka is the cheapest place for the restoration among the beaches in Odesa. A lot of bars and nightclubs makes it a good alternative to the famous Arcadia, which is much more expensive.

Gallery

Sources 

 Одесские парки и скверы: Парк Лузановка
 http://od.vgorode.ua/reference/company/94044/part/70-kp-hydropark-luzanovka
 http://viknaodessa.od.ua/old-photo/?luzanovka
 Места Одессы: Пляжи
 Пляжи Одессы
 В Суворовском районе Одессы благоустроен гидропарк «Лузановка»
 http://info-center.od.ua/11308-v-odesse-blagoustraivayut-centralnuyu-alleyu-gidroparka-luzanovka-foto.html

Parks and gardens in Odesa
Tourist attractions in Odesa